Temple Hornaday Fielding (October 8, 1913–May 18, 1983) was a noted American travel writer who published the Fielding Travel Guides starting in 1948. During World War II, he was a psychological operations operative in Europe under the Office of Strategic Services (OSS).

During World War II, he was a Captain attached to the Morale Operations Branch (MO) unit, 2677th Regiment OSS (Provisional). The "2677" was the subject of an inside joke at MO Rome, since the Pantone color code for the ink used in the forgery of the 6 pfennig Hitler head stamp was 2677. MO Rome was headed by Eugene P. Warner, a civilian, formerly of the Associated Press. MO Rome used an existing Italian printing house where many of the leaflets, posters, and forged postage stamps were printed. Fielding allegedly helped with the printing as part of the Planning Group. Fielding was discharged from the army as a Major on June 6, 1945.

In 1945, his OSS superior, Gene Warner, became public relations director for TWA International Division.  Warner is said to have needed some institutional mentions for the airlines, and asked Temple to scare up some national magazine assignments in which the placements could be made.  Fielding was able to place the airline ads in the Saturday Evening Post and Cosmopolitan.

Fielding's first travel guide, Fielding's Travel Guide to Europe, was published in 1948. In 1951 he and his wife moved from New York to Denmark, but soon resettled in Formentor, Mallorca, Spain, where he established his company headquarters for Fielding Publications, Inc. 

With World War II over, "Biedermeier Europe" being a thing of the past, it was ripe for exploration.  Fielding viewed it as his mission to make Europe available to America. Fielding's guides emphasized hotels, restaurants, and shopping rather than cultural attractions, which he felt were not very important to most of his readers.

Fielding was an editor of the Ladies' Home Journal from 1968-1983 and of Travel and Leisure from 1970-1983.

Robert Young Pelton acquired the Fielding travel guides in 1993; they were published until 1998.

Personal life 
Fielding was the son of George Thomas Fielding II and Helen Ross Hornaday. He was a descendant of Henry Fielding on his father's side and the grandson of the author and naturalist William Temple Hornaday on his mother's side.

He attended a prep school and graduated from Princeton in 1939. He married his literary agent Nancy Parker in October, 1942. They had a son, Dodge Temple Fielding.

He had a heart attack in August 1982 and died on May 18, 1983.

Publications
 Fielding's Travel Guide to Europe: 1954-55
 Fielding's travel guide to Europe 1967
 Fielding's Far East
 Fielding's Travel Guide to Europe 1969
 Super Economy Europe
 A Guide to the Field Artillery Replacement Training Center, Fort Bragg, North Carolina

Bibliography
 "Modern Living: A Guide to Temple Fielding", Time, June 6, 1969

External links
 Portrait on cover of Time magazine, June 6, 1969, Vol. 93 No. 23

Notes 

American travel writers
American male non-fiction writers
1913 births
1983 deaths
Date of birth missing
Date of death missing